Vafunenskaya is a rural locality (a village) in Yavengskoye Rural Settlement, Vozhegodsky District, Vologda Oblast, Russia. The population was 1 as of 2002.

Geography 
Vafunenskaya is located 12 km northwest of Vozhega (the district's administrative centre) by road. Malaya Nazarovskaya is the nearest rural locality.

References 

Rural localities in Vozhegodsky District